Milionia basalis is a moth of the family Geometridae first described by Francis Walker in 1854. It is found in Japan, the north-eastern parts of the Himalayas, Myanmar and Sundaland.

The wingspan is 50–56 mm.

The larvae feed on Dacrydium and Podocarpus species. The adult is day flying. It feed on the nectar flowers of Leptospermum flavescens in the mountains of Peninsular Malaysia.

Subspecies
Milionia basalis basalis
Milionia basalis sharpei (Borneo)
Milionia basalis pyrozona (Peninsular Malaysia, Burma)
Milionia basalis pryeri (Japan)
Milionia basalis guentheri (Sumatra)

External links

"キオビエダシャク Milionia zonea pryeri Druce, 1888". Japanese Moths.

Boarmiini
Moths of Japan